Afawarq Walda Samayat, or Afework Woldesemait (died 5 November 1935), was an Ethiopian administrator and commander.

Biography
In 1935, at the outbreak of the Second Italo-Ethiopian War, grazmach and balambaras Afawarq Walda Samayat was the acting shum of Jijiga.  He worked tirelessly to prepare the Ogaden for war on what was known as the "southern front".  Prior to the Battle of Genale Doria, Balambaras Afawarq Walda Samayat was killed defending Gorahai.

Gorahai was known as an old stronghold of Sayyid Mohammed Abdullah Hassan (called the "Mad Mullah" by the British).  With approximately three thousand fighters under his command, Afawarq Walda Samayat had turned Gorahai into an armed camp.  Bombers of the Italian Royal Air Force (Regia Aeronautica) regularly attacked Gorahai and Afawarq himself directed the fire of the lone anti-aircraft gun, a 37 mm Oerlikon.  The gun was mounted in one of the old-style turrets of the Mad Mullah's antiquated fort.  Afawarq's men quickly learned how to cope with air attacks by diving into deep trenches.  In addition, they had sufficient modern arms to thwart assaults on the ground and to inflict heavy losses.  Afawarq had even overseen the installation of a minefield around his positions.

During one of the regular bombings by the Italians, Afawarq was seriously wounded.  He refused to be taken to the hospital because he feared that the morale of his men would suffer in his absence.  Within 48-hours the wound became gangrenous and, on 5 November 1935, Afawarq collapsed and died.  On 7 November, his fear about the morale of his men proved to be correct and they abandoned Gorahei.  He was posthumously promoted to dejazmach by Emperor Haile Selassie.

See also
 Ethiopian aristocratic and court titles
 Ethiopian Order of Battle Second Italo-Abyssinian War
 Nasibu Emmanual

Notes 
Footnotes

Citations

References
 
 
 
 

Year of birth uncertain
1935 deaths
Ethiopian military personnel killed in action
Deaths from gangrene